Johansson and Vestman (Swedish:Johansson och Vestman) is a 1946 Swedish drama film directed by Olof Molander and starring Holger Löwenadler, Sture Lagerwall and Wanda Rothgardt. The film's sets were designed by the art director Arne Åkermark.

Cast

References

Bibliography 
 Kaplan, Mike. Variety Film Reviews 1907-1980, Volume 16. Taylor & Francis, 1985.

External links 
 

1946 films
1946 drama films
Swedish drama films
1940s Swedish-language films
Films directed by Olof Molander
Swedish black-and-white films
1940s Swedish films